The 2004 New Hampshire Wildcats football team was an American football team that represented the University of New Hampshire as a member of the Atlantic 10 Conference during the 2004 NCAA Division I-AA football season. In its sixth year under head coach Sean McDonnell, the team compiled a 10–3 record (6–2 against conference opponents), finished fourth out of twelve teams in the Atlantic 10 Conference, and lost to Montana in the quarterfinal of the  NCAA Division I-AA Football Championship playoffs.

Schedule

References

New Hampshire
New Hampshire Wildcats football seasons
New Hampshire Wildcats football